Baseball was contested at the 1962 Central American and Caribbean Games in Kingston, Jamaica.

References
 

1962 Central American and Caribbean Games
1962
Central American and Caribbean Games